Hollyn Elizabeth Shadinger  (born October 21, 1997), known professionally as Stela Cole is an American singer-songwriter. Her song “DIY” held the record for the most first week streams on American Song Contest where she reached the semi-finals as a contestant for her home state Georgia. Prior to ASC, Stela independently released her EP, “Woman of the Hour” (2020) and song “I Shot Cupid” (2021) through her self-funded label “Stelavision Records” and AWAL.

Early life 
Hollyn Shadinger was born on October 21, 1997 in Knoxville, Tennessee. She was adopted at birth and grew up Peachtree City, GA. 

Shadinger grew up playing goalkeeper, she injured her back at 15, ending her competitive soccer career. After sustaining a serious back injury during a game, she turned her attention toward writing songs. After recording her first demos, she caught the attention of local producers who recognized her talent and introduced her to eventual manager Steve Sparrow. Sparrow went on to teach Stela how to write songs in a professional manner and is still her manager to this day.

Shadinger graduated from Starr’s Mill High School in 2016 and sung the national anthem at her graduation ceremony. She briefly attended Belmont University to pursue a degree in “Commercial Voice,” but dropped out to focus on her music career with RCA Records.

Career

2018: Musical debut with RCA Records 
In 2018, Cole signed with RCA Records which released her debut single "You F O"  and later on distributed her debut project "Throwing Up Butterflies"

Later in 2018, RCA Records dropped Cole a week after she played them the demo of her song "Love Like Mine" due to creative differences. According to Cole, They wanted her to be a spin-off Meghan Trainor whereas Cole had a entirely different vision for her career and musical future.

2020: Woman Of The Hour EP 
 
In 2020, Cole started to roll out her EP "Woman Of The Hour" via independent music distribution service AWAL.  Before the release of the EP, every track was released as a single except Kiss or Kill which was released with the final EP delivery. The debut single of the EP was "Woman of the Hour.”

In a TikTok livestream, Cole revealed that she was able to fund her extended play, “Woman of the Hour” with the leftover money she saved from her RCA Records deal. Cole also stated on this livestream that she owns the masters to this EP and her song “I Shot Cupid,” therefore earning enough from streaming to pay her bills.

2021: Success and signing to Ultra Records 
In early 2021, Stela teased her single I Shot Cupid on social platform TikTok. She then she released it onto all platforms on 1st June 2021.

Later in 2021, Cole officially signed with Ultra Records.  Her first single with the label was "Walking On The Moon"

2022 to present: Appearing on American Song Contest and preparing debut album 
Cole also appeared in the first ever season of American Song Contest to represent her home-state Georgia. She represented Georgia with the track "DIY"  

Cole made it to the semi-finals of the show where she was eliminated.

In present time, Cole is now working on her Debut Album which is set to release in 2023. She has already released several singles for the project including "Rhapsody In Pink", "Star", "Bye Bye Blues" & more. Cole has revealed that the album will chronicle the stages of a breakup from her point of view

Discography

Extended plays

Singles

As featured artist

References

1997 births
Living people
21st-century American women singers
21st-century American singers
American women pop singers
 
Musicians from Georgia (U.S. state)
Ultra Records artists